Lebanese people in the United Kingdom include people originating from Lebanon who have migrated to the United Kingdom and their descendants.

History and settlement
Although there has been sporadic migration from the Middle East to Britain since the 17th century, the real growth of the UK Lebanese population began in 1975, with the start of the civil war in Lebanon which drove thousands of people away. The exodus was aggravated in 1982 with the Israeli invasion. At the same time, many Lebanese expatriates who were based in West Africa, in particular Nigeria, left for Britain as subsequent military governments took control in those areas.

Demographics

The 2001 UK Census recorded 10,459 Lebanese-born people. The 2011 census recorded 15,341 people born in Lebanon residing in England, 228 in Wales, 314 in Scotland and 52 in Northern Ireland.

Edgware Road in London is one of a number of areas that the Lebanese community has settled in and has shops selling Arabic newspapers, books and music. Other areas with Lebanese communities in London include Bayswater, Kensington and Westbourne Grove.

Lebanese have successfully integrated into British life with many second, third and fourth generations being of mixed Lebanese / British heritage.

Notable individuals

Camille Chamoun: Founding member of the Lebanese community of Kingston-Upon-Hull.

See also

 British Arabs
 Arabs in the United Kingdom
 Arabs in Europe
 Lebanese diaspora

References

External links
 British Lebanese Association
 British Lebanese Business Group
 Lebanese British Friends of the National Museum
 Irish Lebanese Cultural Foundation
 Lebanese Community North of England

Arabs in the United Kingdom
United Kingdom
 
Immigration to the United Kingdom by country of origin